Odin Hansen (16 April 1918 – 14 September 1996) was a Norwegian fisherman and politician.

He was born in Gildeskål to fisherman Hans Jensen and Mathilde Nilsen. He was elected representative to the Storting for the period 1973–1977 for the Socialist Left Party.

References

1918 births
1996 deaths
People from Gildeskål
Socialist Left Party (Norway) politicians
Members of the Storting